Spencer Crew (born 1949) is an American professor, museum director, curator and writer.

Education
Crew received a PhD degree from Rutgers University in 1979. In 2003, he was named to the Rutgers Hall of Distinguished Alumni.

Career
Crew's career in museums began in 1981 when he was hired to work as a historian at the National Museum of American History (NMAH). In 1986, he curated his first exhibition at the museum, Field to Factory: African-American Migration, 1915–1940. He became the first African-American director of the NMAH in 1994.

In 2001, he became the director of the National Underground Railroad Freedom Center.
 
In 2019, Crew was appointed the interim director of the National Museum of African American History and Culture.

Crew is the Clarence J. Robinson Professor of U.S. history at George Mason University.

References

Living people
1949 births
Rutgers University alumni
African-American people
Directors of museums in the United States